Lugazi University (LU), was a private university in Uganda. The university was founded in 2007. It closed in December 2010.

Location

Academics
In September 2007, the university had the following faculties and departments:

 Faculty of Education
 Faculty of Arts
 Faculty of Law
 Faculty of Social Sciences
 Faculty of Business Management
 Faculty of Science & Technology

Courses
Lugazi University offered courses leading to the award of degrees, diplomas and certificates.

Department of Arts and Social Sciences
 Bachelor of Secretarial Studies
 Bachelor of Mass Communication
 Bachelor Social Work and Social Administration
 Bachelor of Industrial Art and Design
 Bachelor of Development Studies
 Bachelor of Public Administration and Management
 Bachelor of Employment and Labor Studies

Department of Education
 Bachelor of Arts with Education
 Bachelor of Science with Education
 Bachelor of Adult and Community Education
 Bachelor of Education Guidance and Counseling
 Bachelor of Education with Special Needs
 Bachelor of Education - Early Childhood

Department of Business Management
 Bachelor of Business Administration
 Bachelor of Commerce
 Bachelor of Human Resources Management
 Bachelor of Procurement and Logistics Management
 Bachelor of Public Sector and Management
 Bachelor of Entrepreneurship and Small Business Management

Department of Computing and Information Technology
 Bachelor of Computer Science
 Bachelor of Library and Information Science
 Bachelor of Information Technology
 Bachelor of Science in Human Nutrition and Dietetics

All the above courses are available at diploma level as well.

Closure
Lugazi University held its first and last graduation ceremony on Wednesday, 29 December 2010. 524 students graduated. Due to mounting debts and other financial hardships, the university's assets and liabilities were acquired by the Uganda Ministry of Defence, effective 30 December 2010. In January 2011, the premises were converted into the University of Military Science and Technology, (UMST), a military school of tertiary leaning, within the Uganda People's Defence Force.

See also
 List of universities in Uganda
 Education in Uganda

References

External links
  Uganda University Guide 2007/08 
Lugazi University Homepage
Owners Consider Selling Lugazi University

Also have Online Store: https://lugazzi.com/

Universities and colleges in Uganda
Educational institutions established in 2007
Educational institutions disestablished in 2010
Buikwe District
2007 establishments in Uganda